The Republic of Brescia was a temporary French client republic in Italy. Established March 18, 1797, in the wake of the French occupation of Brescia and Bergamo, it became part of the Cisalpine Republic November 20, 1797.

See also 
 Fall of the Republic of Venice
 Republic of Bergamo

References 

Client states of the Napoleonic Wars
Modern history of Italy
Brescia
1797 in Europe
Fall of the Republic of Venice